Different snakes are called water snakes. "Water snake" is also sometimes used as a descriptive term for any snakes that spend a significant time in or near fresh water, such as any species belonging to the family Acrochordidae. They should not be confused with sea snakes, which live primarily or entirely in marine environments.

Examples of snakes called water snakes include:

Family Boidae
 Green anaconda - Water boa
Family Colubridae
 Hydrops (snake)
 Hydromorphus
 Hydrodynastes species, including:
Hydrodynastes gigas – false water snake or Brazilian smooth snake
 Natrix natrix
 Natrix tessellata
 Nerodia species
 Opisthotropis species
 Sinonatrix species, including:
 Sinonatrix percarinatus – eastern water snake
 Fowlea species, including:
 Fowlea piscator – Asiatic water snake or chequered keelback
Family Dipsadidae
 Helicops (snake) species, including:
 Helicops angulatus – brown-banded water snake
 Liophis species, including:
 Liophis cobellus
 Liophis reginae
Family Homalopsidae - all species, for example:
 Cerberus rynchops - dog-faced water snake
 Enhydris enhydris - rainbow water snake
 Enhydris plumbea - rice paddy water snake or rice paddy snake
 Homalopsis buccata - puff-faced water snake
Family Viperidae
 Agkistrodon piscivorus - cottonmouth

See also
List of marine snakes

Animal common name disambiguation pages